Mõntu is a village in Saaremaa Parish, Saare County in western Estonia. It is located on the southeast coast of Sõrve Peninsula in the southern part of the island of Saaremaa.

From 2005 to 2008, a ferry route operated between Mõntu harbour and the Latvian port of Ventspils. There are plans to re-launch the route with financial support from Saaremaa Municipality and the Freeport of Ventspils. Preparations for the launch began in 2017, but as of 2020 no potential operator with a suitable vessel had shown interest in operating the service.

References

Villages in Saare County